You're Under Arrest is a 1985 album recorded by Miles Davis, presenting a mixture of pop covers (including Cyndi Lauper's "Time After Time" and Michael Jackson's "Human Nature"), and original material dealing with politics, racism, pollution and war. It is the first Davis album since On the Corner in 1972 to feature electric guitarist John McLaughlin, and the first to feature alto saxophonist Kenny Garrett, who was in the Davis touring group at that time.

Background 
During the recording sessions, bass player Darryl Jones introduced Sting to Davis, who was an idol of his. Sting was startled when Davis asked if he spoke French; after he said yes, Davis asked him to translate the Miranda warning into French and yell it into the microphone against a backing track.

It marked the ending of Davis's 30-year association with Columbia Records, although the label released the 1984 recording Aura in 1989, and would release many archival recordings after Davis died.

Track listing
Columbia – FC 40023

Personnel

Musicians 
 Miles Davis – trumpet, "Police Voices, Davis Voices" (1), arrangements (1-7, 9), Oberheim OB-Xa (5, 6)
 Robert Irving III – synthesizers (1-4, 7, 9), arrangements (2, 4-7, 9), Yamaha DX7 (5, 6, 8), Korg Polysix (5, 6), Oberheim OB-Xa (5, 6), organ (8), clavinet (8), celesta (9)
 John Scofield – guitar (1, 2, 3, 7, 8, 9), arrangements (8)
 John McLaughlin – all guitars (4), guitar (5, 6)
 Darryl Jones, aka "The Munch" – bass
 Al Foster – drums (1, 7, 8, 9)
 Vincent Wilburn – drums (2, 3), Simmons drums (4, 5, 6)
 Steve Thornton – percussion, Spanish voice (1)
 Bob Berg – soprano saxophone (1), tenor saxophone (8, 9)
 Kenny Garrett – alto saxophone (2)
 Sting (credited as Gordon Sumner) – French policeman's voice (1)
 Marek Olko – Polish voice (1)
 James "J.R." Prindiville (Jim Rose, road manager) – sound of handcuffs (1)

Production 
 Dr. George Butler – executive producer
 Miles Davis – producer, illustration
 Robert Irving III – producer
 Vincent Wilburn – co-producer
 Eddie Ciletti – engineer, technician
 Ron Lorman – engineer, mixing 
 Tom Swift – engineer, mixing
 Nick Joyce – studio technician 
 Bob Ludwig – mastering at Masterdisk (New York City, New York)
 Jim Rose – production coordination
 Lane/Donald – art direction
 Anthony Barboza –  photography
 Blank & Blank – management

References

1985 albums
Miles Davis albums
John Scofield albums
Jazz fusion albums by American artists
Jazz-funk albums
Columbia Records albums